A déclaration d'utilité publique, or declaration of public utility, is a formal recognition in French law that a proposed project has public benefits. The declaration must be obtained for many large construction projects in France, especially for infrastructure, before work can begin.

Process
The first part of the declaration is a public inquiry, usually started by a prefect, to collect the views of all affected parties. Responses from affected parties are considered by a commissioner, who assesses whether the proposal has an overall benefit for the public.

If the finding is favourable, the declaration is granted by decree.

Legal basis
The déclaration d'utilité publique was initially required by article 545 of the Civil Code, which stipulates that property cannot be confiscated except for public purposes and with fair compensation.

See also
 Eminent domain

References

Law of France
Eminent domain